The South Oakdale Historic District comprises a primarily residential area along South Oakdale Avenue in Medford, Oregon, United States. Development of this well-preserved residential neighborhood began in 1890, soon after Medford's founding in 1883, and continued until around 1940. It became one of the city's grand neighborhoods, with many residents prominent in land development, business, agriculture, law, medicine, education, politics, and the arts. The district exhibits a wide range of architectural styles from its period of development, notably including several works by Frank Chamberlain Clark, southern Oregon's preeminent architect of the early 20th century.

The district was added to the National Register of Historic Places in 1979.

See also
Central Medford High School
National Register of Historic Places listings in Jackson County, Oregon

References

External links

Historic districts on the National Register of Historic Places in Oregon
Medford, Oregon
National Register of Historic Places in Jackson County, Oregon